Fletcher Smith may refer to:

 Fletcher Smith (rugby union) (born 1995), New Zealand rugby union player
 Fletcher Smith (American football) (born 1943), American football safety